Latterman is an American semi-active four-piece punk rock band from Huntington, New York, United States. A melodic punk rock band with vocals shared by Phil Douglas and Mattie Jo Canino, their songs often contain political and/or socially conscious lyrics. The band is considered highly influential in the Melodic Punk genre with their album No Matter Where We Go... being considered a staple of the genre. Phil Douglas and Mattie Jo Canino respectively would go on to form the equally acclaimed Iron Chic and RVIVR. Canino, Douglas and Schramm would go on to form Tender Defender in 2015, considered by many to be an extension of Latterman.

Background
The band was formed in 1999 by Matt Canino, Phil Douglas, Dan Sposato and Pat Schramm following the dissolution of Canino's, Douglas' and Sposato's previous band, Five Days Late. In 1999 the band issued their first demo and self released their debut None Of These Songs Are About Girls in 2000. After Sposato's exit and a few replacements, the band finally found a steady guitarist in Mike "MR" Campbell and released their cult classic Turn Up The Punk, We'll Be Singing on Traffic Violation Records.

In 2005 the band struck a deal with Deep Elm Records and released the landmark and highly influential No Matter Where We Go... as well as a re-release of the out-of-print Turn Up The Punk, We'll Be Singing.

Following the release of No Matter Where We Go... Campbell exit the band and was replaced by Brian Crozier. This lineup of the band released their 4th and final album, 2006's We Are Still Alive.

On October 18, 2007, music website Punknews.org reported that the band has officially broken up. Canino issued a statement via Punknews where she stated that "I Felt like a broken record going on tour and talking about sexism in punk rock every night and then some fucking bro-dudes coming up to me and saying some fucked up shit. I even got to a point where I stopped calling them out on it, and that just felt wrong. I was tired. Basically, it just stopped making sense for everyone in the band to keep on doing the band."

Members have since gone on to play in bands including Iron Chic, Bridge and Tunnel, RVIVR,  Laura Stevenson and The Cans, Daytrader, Pox, Shorebirds, Mutoid Men (not to be confused with Mutoid Man) and The Brass.

In December of 2011, the band reunited for four shows with the No Matter Where We Go... lineup. To coincide with the reunion shows, the band released "Our Better Halves", an unreleased song that was the last thing they ever recorded.

Since 2011, the band has played live sporadically since their break up with having performed a small handful of shows in 2011, 2012, 2016 and 2018. 2016 saw the release of the self-titled debut from Tender Defender, a band formed by 3/4ths of the band (Canino, Douglas and Schramm). 

The band's singers - Phil Douglas and Mattie Jo Canino currently play in Iron Chic and RVIVR respectively.

Members
Phil Douglas - Vocals/Guitar
Mattie Jo Canino - Vocals/Bass
Mike "MR" Campbell- Guitar
Pat Schramm - Drums

Former members
Dan  Sposato
Bryce Hackford
Brian Crozier
Ian Campbell
Jeff Cunningham

Discography 
None of These Songs Are About Girls (self-released, 2000)
Split 7" with Nakatomi Plaza (Rok Lok Records / BD Records / Sot Records, 2000)
Turn Up The Punk, We'll Be Singing (Traffic Violation Records, 2002; reissued on Deep Elm Records, 2005. LP vinyl pressing on Yo-Yo Records 2006, LP vinyl pressing on NO IDEA Records 2011.)
No Matter Where We Go...! (Deep Elm Records, 2005 LP vinyl pressing on Yo-Yo Records 2006, LP vinyl pressing on NO IDEA Records 2011.)
We Are Still Alive (Deep Elm Records, 2006 LP vinyl pressing on NO IDEA Records 2007)

Other releases 
V/A The Hope Machine compilation CD (Rok Lok Records, 2001)
V/A Young Til I Die compilation CD (Waggy Records, 2001)
V/A Commercial: Traffic Violation Records Compilation (Traffic Violation 2002)
Live At The Milestone - June 2005 DVD (Deep Elm Records, 2005)
V/A This Was Supposed to be a Celebration compilation CD (Mauled by Tigers, 2007)
"Our Better Halves" (Single) (Self-Released, 2011)

References

External links
Official Deep Elm Website
Official Rok Lok Records Website
Official burnitdown/REBUILD Website
PureVolume Website
Official Band Website
Official Latterman Myspace Page
Official Yo-Yo Records Page
Latterman house show video

Musical groups established in 2000
Musical groups disestablished in 2007
Musical groups from Long Island
People from Huntington Station, New York
Punk rock groups from New York (state)